The Consumer Protection Act, 1986 (COPRA)  was an Act by the Parliament of India elected to protect the interests of consumers in India.It was replaced by the Consumer Protection Act, 2019. It was made for the establishment of consumer councils and other authorities for the settlement of consumer's grievances and matters connected with it. The act was passed in Assembly in October 1986 and came into force on December 24, 1986. The statute on the right was made before this COPRA act 1986.

Significance of the Act 
This Act is regarded as the 'Magna Carta' in the field of consumer protection for checking unfair trade practices, ‘defects in goods’ and ‘deficiencies in services’ as far as India is concerned. It has led to the establishment of a widespread network of consumer forums and appellate courts all over India. It has significantly impacted how businesses approach consumers and have empowered consumers to a greater extent.

Consumer Protection Council 
Consumer Protection Councils are established at the national, state and district level to increase consumer awareness. They guide
consumers on how to file cases in the Consumer Disputes Redressal Commissions.

Various Consumer Organizations 
To increase the awareness of consumers, there are many consumer organisations and NGOs that have been established. Consumer Guidance Society of India (CGSI) was the first consumer organization established in India in 1966; It was followed by many others such as:

 Consumer Education And Research Centre (Gujarat)
 Bureau Of Indian Standards
 Federation Of Consumer Organisation In Tamil Nadu
 Mumbai Grahak Panchayat
 Consumer Voice (New Delhi)
 Legal Aid Society (Kolkata)
 Akhil Bhartiya Grahak Panchayat
 The Consumers Eye India.
 United India Consumer's Association.

Consumer Disputes Redressal Agencies 

 District Consumer Disputes Redressal Commission (DCDRC): Also known as the "District Commission" is established by the State Government in each district of the State. The State Governments may establish more than one District Forum in a district.
 State Consumer Disputes Redressal Commission (SCDRC): Also known as the "State Commission" established by the State Government in the State. It is a state-level court that takes up cases valuing less than 
 National Consumer Disputes Redressal Commission (NCDRC): Established by the Central Government. It deals with matters of more than ₹100 million.

Objectives of the central council 
The objectives of the Central Council are to promote and protect the rights of the consumers such as:- 
 The right to be protected against the marketing of goods and services which are hazardous to life and property.
 The right to be informed about the quality, quantity, potency, purity, standard and price of goods or services, as the case may be to protect the consumer against unfair trade practices;
 The right to be assured, wherever possible, access to a variety of goods and services at competitive prices ;
 The right to be heard and to be assured that consumer's interest will receive due consideration at appropriate forums;
 The right to seek redressal against unfair trade practices or restrictive trade practices or unscrupulous exploitation of consumers
 The right to consumer education...

Jurisdiction/Three Tier System of Council Courts

Jurisdiction of District Forum 
 Subject to the other provisions of this Act, the District Forum shall have jurisdiction to entertain complaints where the value of the goods or services and the compensation, if any, claimed does not exceed rupees one crore.
 A complaint shall be instituted in a District Forum within the local limits of whose jurisdiction:-
 a) – the opposite party or each of the opposite parties, where there are more than one, at the time of the institution of the complaint, actually and voluntarily resides or carries on business or has a branch office or personally works for gain, or
 b) – any of the opposite parties, where there are more than one, at the time of the institution of the complaint, actually and voluntarily resides, or carries on business or has a branch office, or personally works for gain, provided that in such case either the permission of the District Forum is given, or the opposite parties who do not reside, or carry on business or have a branch office, or personally work for gain, as the case may be, acquiesce in such institution; or
 c) – the cause of action, wholly or in part, arises.

Consumer courts do not have jurisdiction over matters where services or goods were bought for a commercial purpose.

Jurisdiction of State Commission 
Subject to the other provisions of this Act, the State Commission shall have jurisdiction:-
 a) to entertain
 i) complaints where the value of the goods or services and compensation, if any, claimed exceeds rupees one crore but does not exceed rupees ten crore; and
 ii) appeals against the orders of any District Forum within the State; and
 b) to call for the records and pass appropriate orders in any consumer dispute

Jurisdiction of National Commission 
 (a) to entertain—

 (i) complaints where the value of the goods or services and compensation, if any, claimed exceeds rupees ten crore; and

 (ii) appeals against the orders of any State mayor; and

 (b) to call for the records and pass appropriate orders in any consumer dispute which is pending before or has been decided by any State Commission. However, the Supreme Court of India has held that the jurisdiction of National Commission under Revision Jurisdiction is very limited and can only be exercised when State Commission exceeds its jurisdiction, fails to exercise its jurisdiction or there is material illegality in the order passed by State Commission.

References

External links 
 Text of the Act

Acts of the Parliament of India 1986
Consumer protection legislation
1986 in law
Consumer protection in India
Ministry of Consumer Affairs, Food and Public Distribution
Repealed Acts of the Parliament of India
False advertising law